Ulrike Gauss (5 November 1941 – 5 April 2021) was a German art historian.

Gauss is seen as one of the most renowned German art historians of her era. She became professor.

Gauss died on 5 April 2021, aged 79.

References

20th-century German historians
German art historians
German women historians
1941 births
2021 deaths
People from Tübingen
Place of death missing
20th-century German women